Martín Abadi (born 1963) is an Argentine computer scientist, working at Google . He earned his Doctor of Philosophy (PhD) in computer science from Stanford University in 1987 as a student of Zohar Manna.

He is well known for his work on computer security and on programming languages, including his paper (with Michael Burrows and Roger Needham) on the Burrows–Abadi–Needham logic for analyzing authentication protocols, and his book (with Luca Cardelli) A Theory of Objects, laying out formal calculi for the semantics of object-oriented programming languages.

In 1993, he published the programming language Baby Modula-3, a safe subset or sublanguage of Modula-3, based on functional programming and set theory ideals. Abadi is a core developer for the machine learning framework Tensorflow.

He is a 2008 Fellow of the Association for Computing Machinery. In 2011, he was a temporary professor at the Collège de France in Paris, teaching computer security. He was elected a member of the National Academy of Engineering in 2018 for contributions to the formal theory of computer security.

References

External links 
 , UCSC

1963 births
Living people
American computer scientists
Computer security academics
Stanford University School of Engineering alumni
University of California, Santa Cruz faculty
Fellows of the Association for Computing Machinery
Google people
Members of the United States National Academy of Engineering
Argentine expatriates in the United States